Hans Karl Peterlini (born 12 March 1961) is an author, journalist, university professor and educational researcher originally from South Tyrol (Südtirol/Alto Adige), an autonomous, mostly German speaking province in Northern Italy.

Like over 2/3 of the people living in the province, Hans Karl is a native speaker of German, which has historically been the majority language spoken by the local population. His older brother is a politician Oskar Peterlini.

Biography
Born in Bozen/Bolzano, Hans Karl grew up with his family in the South Tyrolean Unterland, just few miles south of Bozen. He attended the Liceo classico in Bozen where he obtained the "Maturità", the Italian high-school diploma.

Peterlini became a journalist in 1982. By that time he had already produced some youthful contributions to Dolomiten, the regional daily newspaper.  In 1982 he took a job with ff – Südtiroler Wochenmagazin, a weekly news magazine with broadly liberal views on politics and economics. He remained with the Wochenmagazin till 1990, by which time he had become its editor in chief. After that he joined with Hubertus Czernin and the Lentsch family to set up a rival news magazine, Südtirol Profil. When the rival magazine folded he returned to ff – Südtiroler Wochenmagazin, resuming his role as editor in chief between 1998 and 2004.   His career as a journalist placed him at the heart of a resurgence in the German language print media in South Tyrol (Alto Adige) which accompanied an acceptance of some political and cultural decentralization by the authorities in Rome.

Enduring themes in his writing included the balance of risks between violent confrontation and peaceful co-existence in recent South Tyrol history, coupled with related questions involving how people might grow beyond traditional cultural patterns and ethnic hostilities that had been a feature of the region since its involuntary incorporation into Italy during the second decade of the twentieth century. During the early years of the twenty-first century he published his first books on themes of South Tyrol terrorism, and his book "Wir Kinder der Südtirol-Autonomie" (2003 - "We, the Children of South Tyrol Devolution").

In 2004 Peterlini backed away from his journalistic career in order to become a student at the University of Innsbruck where he studied Pedagogy with a focus on psychoanalytical aspects. His objective was to be able to revisit the themes of his previous writing from a more academic perspective. His dissertation, submitted in 2006, was entitled "The Explosion of Power and Powerlessness" ("Die Sprengung von Macht und Ohnmacht"), and attempted to provide a psychoanalytic perspective on the terrorist attacks in South Tyrol between 1956 and 1967.   He undertook further related training (Psychoanalystic Propädeutikum, Interpersonal Communication and Coaching). His doctorate, received from the Faculty of Education Sciences at the Free University of Bolzano (Bozen), followed in 2010. The theme of his dissertation was "Homeland" as a catch-all for political identity in South Tyrol. Further elucidation comes from the Italian title used when it was published as a book, "Understanding the other" ("Capire l’altro").

He received his habilitation (higher academic qualification) from Innsbruck for a dissertation entitled "Learning and Power:  Paradigms of Education and Training in Schools, Culture and Politics" ("Lernen und Macht. Paradigmata der Bildung in Schule, Kultur, Politik") and he received his corresponding teaching certificate. For the 2014/2015 academic year he obtained the teaching chair in "General Education Sciences and Intercultural Education" at Klagenfurt's Alpen-Adria University.

References

Writers from Bolzano
Newspaper journalists
Italian writers in German
Academic staff of the University of Klagenfurt
20th-century Italian writers
20th-century Italian male writers
21st-century Italian writers
21st-century Italian male writers
1961 births
Living people